The Business is Australia's leading business news television programme on ABC and ABC News in Australia.

The program is hosted by Alicia Barry. It is broadcast four nights a week Monday to Thursday at 8.45pm (AEST/AEDT) weekdays on ABC News and 10.30pm (AEST/AEDT) on ABC.

The program format involves a wrap up of the domestic market movements of the day, feature stories on business news events and usually at least one interview per night with leading business and political figures.

The programme also features overseas market news and analysis from major stock exchanges. It is broadcast from the ABC's Sydney studio in Ultimo.

History
The program launched on 14 August 2006 as Lateline Business and was rebranded as The Business in January 2012. In May 2010, host Ali Moore left Lateline Business to host Afternoon Live on ABC News and was replaced by Ticky Fullerton.

In December 2016, Ticky Fullerton resigned from the ABC and Elysse Morgan replaced her.

In December 2022, Elysse Morgan resigned from the ABC after 15 years.

See also 
 List of Australian television series

References

External links 
 Official The Business Website

Australian Broadcasting Corporation original programming
ABC News and Current Affairs
Australian television news shows
Television shows set in New South Wales
2006 Australian television series debuts
2010s Australian television series
English-language television shows